Quasi-empirical methods are methods applied in science and mathematics to achieve epistemology similar to that of empiricism (thus quasi- + empirical) when experience cannot falsify the ideas involved. Empirical research relies on empirical evidence, and its empirical methods involve experimentation and disclosure of apparatus for reproducibility, by which scientific findings are validated by other scientists. Empirical methods are studied extensively in the philosophy of science, but they cannot be used directly in fields whose hypotheses cannot be falsified by real experiment (for example, mathematics, philosophy, theology, and ideology). Because of such empirical limits in science, the scientific method must rely not only on empirical methods but sometimes also on quasi-empirical ones. The prefix quasi- came to denote methods that are "almost" or "socially approximate" an ideal of truly empirical methods.

It is unnecessary to find all counterexamples to a theory; all that is required to disprove a theory logically is one counterexample. The converse does not prove a theory; Bayesian inference simply makes a theory more likely, by weight of evidence.

One can argue that no science is capable of finding all counter-examples to a theory, therefore, no science is strictly empirical, it's all quasi-empirical. But usually, the term "quasi-empirical" refers to the means of choosing problems to focus on (or ignore), selecting prior work on which to build an argument or proof, notations for informal claims, peer review and acceptance, and incentives to discover, ignore, or correct errors.  These are common to both science and mathematics, and do not include experimental method.

Albert Einstein's discovery of the general relativity theory relied upon thought experiments and mathematics. Empirical methods only became relevant when confirmation was sought. Furthermore, some empirical confirmation was found only some time after the general acceptance of the theory.

Thought experiments are almost standard procedure in philosophy, where a conjecture is tested out in the imagination for possible effects on experience; when these are thought to be implausible,  unlikely to occur, or not actually occurring, then the conjecture may be either rejected or amended.  Logical positivism was a perhaps extreme version of this practice, though this claim is open to debate.

Post-20th-century philosophy of mathematics is mostly concerned with quasi-empirical mathematical methods, especially as reflected in the actual mathematical practice of working mathematicians.

See also
 Philosophy of science

Scientific method
Philosophy of science
Philosophy of mathematics
Thought experiments